Song of Songs 2 (abbreviated  as Song 2) is the second chapter of the Song of Songs in the Hebrew Bible or the Old Testament of the Christian Bible. This book is one of the Five Megillot, a collection of short books, together with Ruth, Lamentations, Ecclesiastes and Esther, within the Ketuvim, the third and the last part of the Hebrew Bible. Jewish tradition views Solomon as the author of this book (although this is now largely disputed), and this attribution influences the acceptance of this book as a canonical text. This chapter contains a dialogue in the open air and several female poems with the main imagery of flora and fauna.

Text
The original text is written in Hebrew language. This chapter is divided into 17 verses.

Textual witnesses
Some early manuscripts containing the text of this chapter in Hebrew are of the Masoretic Text, which includes the Aleppo Codex (10th century), and Codex Leningradensis (1008). Some fragments containing parts of this chapter were found among the Dead Sea Scrolls, assigned as 4Q107 (4QCantb); 30 BCE-30 CE; extant verses 9–17).

There is also a translation into Koine Greek known as the Septuagint, made in the last few centuries BCE. Extant ancient manuscripts of the Septuagint version include Codex Vaticanus (B; B; 4th century), Codex Sinaiticus (S; BHK: S; 4th century), and Codex Alexandrinus (A; A; 5th century).

Structure
The Modern English Version (MEV) attributes the voices in this chapter as follows:
 = The Woman (continued from )
 = The Man
 = The Woman

Female: Love in paradise (1:16–2:1)

Verse 1 closes a poetic section providing a 'picture of the bed as a spreading growth', using a theme of nature's floras, starting from the previous chapter with verses 1:16–17 focusing on the subject of trees and verse 2:1 on the subject of flowers.

Verse 1

I am the rose of Sharon, and the lily of the valleys.
"Rose of Sharon" (Septuagint: "ἄνθος τοῦ πεδίου"; Vulgate: "flos campi"; Wiclif: "a flower of the field"): is thought to be a kind of crocus growing as a "lily among brambles" (Song 2:1-2) in the Sharon plain.
"Rose": is translated from the Hebrew word ḥăḇatzeleṯ, that occurs two times in the scriptures, beside in this verse also in Isaiah 35:1, which reads, "the desert shall bloom like the rose". The word translated as "rose" in KJV is rendered variously as "lily" (Septuagint: "κρίνον", Vulgate: "lilium", Wiclif: "lily"), "jonquil" (Jerusalem Bible) and "crocus" (RSV).
"Sharon": the Mediterranean coastal plain which spans south of the slopes of Mount Carmel, extending about 30 miles south to the Yarkon River north of Joppa, varying from about 8 to 12 miles in width.

Male: My love is like a flower (2:2)
Verse 2 links to verse 1 on the use of "lily" (or "lotus"), and forms a parallel with verse 3 on the word order and the use of particles ("as" or "like", "so") as well as the 'terms of endearment' ("my love", "my beloved", or "my darling", "my lover").

Verse 2
As the lily among thorns, so is my love among the daughters.
The masculine form of the same root word to call the man ("my [male] friend"; Hebrew:) is used in a parallel construction with "my beloved" (Hebrew:) in Song of Songs 5:16.

Female: A pastoral scene (2:3-7)
The verse 3 shows an 'excellent synonymous parallelism' with verse 2 on the word order and the use of certain words, such as "as" or "like", "so", "among" or "between", "my love"/"my beloved" or "my darling"/"my lover". Each verse begins with a preposition of comparison ("as"), followed by three Hebrew words consisting of a singular noun, a preposition ("among" or "between"; be^n) and a plural common noun with a definite article.

Verse 3
As the apple tree among the trees of the wood, so is my beloved among the sons.
I sat down under his shadow with great delight, and his fruit was sweet to my taste.
The sensual imagery of "apple tree" as a place of romance is still used in modern times in songs such as "In the Shade of the Old Apple Tree" and "Don't Sit Under the Apple Tree".

Verse 4
He brought me to the banqueting house, and his banner over me was love.
"The banqueting house" is a rendering of the phrase bet hayyayin, which is only used here in the Bible, literally meaning "house of the wine".

Verse 5
Sustain me with raisins,
refresh me with apples;
for I am faint with love.
The first two lines of this verse form a 'distinctive structure', using verbs and preposition of the same ideas: "refresh (sustain) me"/"revive (refresh) me", "with raisins"/"with apples". The word "apple(s)" links to the first word of verse 3, while the word "love" links to the last word of verse 4.

Verse 7
I charge you, O daughters of Jerusalem,
By the gazelles or by the does of the field,
Do not stir up nor awaken love
Until it pleases.
Cross references: Song of Songs 3:5; 8:4
"Charge" or "adjure"
The names of God are apparently substituted with similar sounding phrases depicting 'female gazelles' for [God of] hosts, and 'does of the field'/'wild does/female deer' (ha-) for God Almighty.

Female: Her lover pursues her (2:8–9)
This section starts a poetic exposition of lovers who are joined and separated (–). Verses 8–17 form a unity of a poem of the spring by the woman, beginning with 'the voice of my beloved' (or 'the sound of his [approach]'), which signals his presence before he even speaks. Andrew Harper suggests that the scene moves now from Jerusalem ("daughters of Jerusalem" in verse 7) to "some royal residence in the country", probably the northern hills.

Male: Invitation to come away (2:10-14)

Verse 13
The fig tree putteth forth her green figs, and the vines with the tender grape give a good smell. Arise, my love, my fair one, and come away.
"Green figs": is translated from the Hebrew word paggâh, which occurs in its Aramaic form in the city name, "Bethphage". The plural form paggîm are used to call unripe fruits of the early fig (Hebrew: bikkûrâh), which takes about four months to ripe, usually towards the end of June, in contrast to the late figs (Hebrew: tě’çnîm) that grow continuously on the new branches and ripen usually they ripen from August onwards in Palestine.
"My love": see notes on verse 2.

Verse 14
O my dove, that art in the clefts of the rock, in the secret places of the stairs, let me see thy countenance, let me hear thy voice; for sweet is thy voice, and thy countenance is comely.
"Dove" (as in Song 5:2) serves as a 'metaphor for inaccessibility'.

Couple: Protect our love (2:15)

Verse 15
Catch the foxes for us,
the little foxes
that spoil the vineyards,
for our vineyards are in blossom.
"Foxes": or "jackals". The foxes are associated with the obstacle of the blossoming romantic relationship.

Female: Love affirmed, gratification delayed (2:16-17)
Unlike the ambiguity of the speaker (or speakers) in the previous verse, the two verses in this section are no doubt spoken by the woman, affirming the mutual affection with her lover.

Verse 16
My beloved is mine, and I am his: he feedeth among the lilies.
In reversed order compared to Song 6:3.

See also
Catch for Us the Foxes
Jerusalem
Sharon plain
Related Bible parts: Song of Songs 1

References

Sources

External links
 Jewish translations:
 Shir Hashirim - Song of Songs - Chapter 2 (Judaica Press) translation [with Rashi's commentary] at Chabad.org
 Christian translations:
 Online Bible at GospelHall.org (ESV, KJV, Darby, American Standard Version, Bible in Basic English)
 Song of Solomon Chapter 2 King James Version
  Various versions

02